The 8 cm Kanone C/80 was a field gun developed during the late 1800s by Krupp for the export market.  It saw action in numerous regional conflicts as well as World War I.

History
After the Franco-Prussian War, the German Army began to study replacements for its existing C/61 breech loaded cannon.  Although the breech-loaded steel C/61 had outclassed its French muzzle-loading bronze rivals during the war, its Wahrendorff breech was unpopular with gun crews.  The new gun, designated the C/73 would retain the same  caliber of the C/61, and would equip cavalry artillery regiments of the German Army.

Krupp was also active on the export market at this time and one of their stock models was the C/80, which although similar to the C/73 had a longer 27 caliber barrel.  Despite being called an 8 cm cannon in the Krupp catalog, it actually fired  ammunition. The German and Austro-Hungarian Army during that period rounded up to the nearest centimeter. To confuse things even further the C/80 was often given model numbers by their customers based on the year they were purchased or when their armories began licensed production.

The C/80 armed the Ottoman Empire and the Balkan states during the late 1800s and during World War I. These were either purchased from Krupp, produced under license or were captured from the Ottomans during the Balkan Wars. The Turks used C/73's and C/80's that they had converted to makeshift anti-aircraft guns as late as 1922.

Design
The C/80 was of built-up construction with a central rifled tube, a reinforcing hoop from the trunnions to the breech and used new smokeless powder for greater muzzle velocity and range.  The C/80 used the same type of breech as the C/73 known as a cylindro-prismatic breech that was a predecessor of Krupp's horizontal sliding-block and the gun used separate-loading, bagged charges and projectiles.  Since the C/80 had limited elevation +8° to +24° it was a direct fire weapon meant to fire on infantry in the open and the most common types of shells were common, canister and shrapnel.  Like the C/73 the C/80 was normally assigned to cavalry artillery batteries.

The C/80 had a box trail carriage built from bolted steel plates instead of wood.  The C/80 did not have a recoil mechanism or a gun shield.  For transport, the gun was attached to a limber for towing by a 6-horse team.  The limber also had seats for crew members plus ammunition and supplies.  There were also seats attached to the axle of the gun carriage for the crew.

Users

Wars

 Greco-Turkish War (1897)
 War of the Pacific
 Second Boer War
 Italo-Turkish War
 Balkan Wars
 World War I
 Greco-Turkish War (1919–1922)

Photo Gallery

References

External links

75 mm artillery
World War I guns
Artillery of Bulgaria
Artillery of Greece
Artillery of Serbia
Artillery of the Ottoman Empire
Artillery of Romania
Krupp